Gari Moka (born 16 November 1983) in Papua New Guinea is a footballer.

References 

1983 births
Living people
Papua New Guinean footballers
Papua New Guinea international footballers
Association football forwards
Papua New Guinean expatriate footballers
Eastern Stars FC players
Papua New Guinean expatriate sportspeople in Australia
Expatriate soccer players in Australia